The 1987–88 League of Ireland Premier Division was the third season of the League of Ireland Premier Division. The Premier Division was made up of 12 teams.

Overview
The Premier Division was contested by 12 teams and Dundalk F.C. won the championship.

Final Table

Results

Matches 1–22

Matches 23–33

See also
 1987–88 League of Ireland First Division

References

Ireland, 1987-88
1
League of Ireland Premier Division seasons